Fjellværsøya is an island in the municipality of Hitra in Trøndelag county, Norway.  The island is located in the eastern part of Hitra municipality, east of the main island of Hitra and it is surrounded by the Frøyfjorden, Kråkvågfjorden, and Fillfjorden.

The small islands of Herøya and Ulvøya lie to the north, the big island of Hitra to the south and west, and the Kråkvåg islands (in nearby Ørland municipality) to the east.  The  island is connected to the village of Ansnes on the island of Hitra by the Krabbsundet bridge and to the village Knarrlagsund on the island of Ulvøya by the Knarrlagsund bridge.

The main industries on the island include agriculture, fishing, and fish processing.  The Nordbotn chapel is located in the village of Nordbotn.

See also
List of islands of Norway

References

Islands of Trøndelag
Hitra